Dejan Patrčević (born November 2, 1975 in Zagreb) is a Croatian PRO triathlete with notable success in ITU World Triathlon Cup and Ironman series. Dejan Patrčević holded Croatian Ironman Record (8:12:18) for more than 13 years and has placed 23rd in Ironman World Championship 2008 what is the best ever achievement of one long distance Croatian triathlete at Ironman World Championship.

Dejan wins 2016 Wings for Life World Run race in Zadar with a distance of 56 km.

Results

Below table includes major results in the period of 2002 - 2011. Dejan Patrcevic is still participating in the triathlon races, and additional results are visible on the ITU Dejan Patrcevic results page.

Coaching career
Dejan is Croatian first Ironman certified Coach (generation 2015) from Ironman U University.

He is a founder and Head Coach at Adriatic Coaching and organizer of triathlon camp at Adriatic, particularly at the island of Hvar.

Ambassador
Dejan ia and was involved in some of the major sports projects in Croatia where he served as Ambassador:
 Wings for Life World Run Zadar (from 2014), 
 Ironman 70.3 Pula (2015-2017),
 B2B Run Croatia (from 2016).
Ironman 70.3 Slovenian Istria (2019-2021)

References

External links
AdriaticCoaching.com – Dejan Patrčević is founder and head coach
Triathlon.org - Dejan Patrčević ITU profile page
YouTube.com – Dejan Patrčević on videos, tips and motivational
Facebook Private – Dejan Patrčević private on Facebook
Facebook Page – Facebook Page of Ex-PRO Dejan Patrčević 
Flickr.com – Dejan Patrčević flickr.com account
AdriaticCaching Facebook – AdriaticCoaching Facebook page

1975 births
Croatian male triathletes
Living people